Atarashiki Nihongo Rokku No Michi To Hikari (新しき日本語ロックの道と光) was the first album by the Japanese rock band Sambomaster.

Track listing 
 Itoshiki Hibi
 Sono Nukumori ni Yō ga Aru
 Hito wa Sore o Jōnetsu to Yobu
 Yogisha de Yatte Kita Aitsu
 Zanzō
 Kono Yo no Hate
 Sayonara Baby
 Oh Baby
 Soredemo Kamawanai
 Asa

2003 debut albums
Sambomaster albums